The women's 4 × 100 metre medley relay competition of the swimming events at the 1983 Pan American Games took place on 21 August. The last Pan American Games champion was the United States.

Results
All times are in minutes and seconds.

Heats

Final 
The final was held on August 21.

References

Swimming at the 1983 Pan American Games
Pan